Discovery Channel is an American multinational pay television network.

Discovery Channel may also refer to:

TV channels
Discovery Channel (Australia and New Zealand)
Discovery Channel (British and Irish TV channel)
Discovery Channel (Canadian TV channel)
Discovery Channel (Danish TV channel)
Discovery Channel (Dutch TV channel)
Discovery Channel Europe
Discovery Channel Finland
Discovery Channel (Flemish TV channel)
Discovery Channel (French TV channel)
Discovery Channel (German TV channel)
Discovery Channel (Hungarian TV channel)
Discovery Channel (Indian TV channel)
Discovery Channel (Italian TV channel)
Discovery Channel Mexico
Discovery Channel (Middle East and North Africa)
Discovery Channel (Norwegian TV channel)
Discovery Channel (Polish TV channel)
Discovery Channel (Portuguese TV channel)
Discovery Channel (Romanian TV channel)
Discovery Channel (Russian TV channel)
Discovery Channel (Southeast Asian TV channel)
Discovery Channel (Swedish TV channel)

Other
Discovery Channel Pro Cycling Team, a US-based road bicycle racing team
Discovery Channel Telescope, at Lowell Observatory
Discovery Channel Young Scientist Challenge